A toxin is a naturally occurring organic poison produced by the metabolic activities of living cells or organisms.

Toxin may also refer to:
Naturally occurring non-organic toxicants such as arsenic.
Synthetic analogs of naturally occurring organic poisons.
Toxin (novel) is a 1998 novel by Robin Cook
Toxin (comics), a fictional character by Marvel Comics universe, "grandson" of Venom and ally of Spider-Man
Toxins (journal), an academic journal focusing on Toxicology

See also
Tocsin (disambiguation), a form of alarm
Toxicity (disambiguation)
Toxification
Toxxin, American professional wrestler